Joseph Earl Thomas (born March 25, 1963) is a former American football wide receiver.  He played in the National Football League (NFL) for the New Orleans Saints. He collegiately played for Mississippi Valley State Delta Devils in the NCAA.  Thomas was drafted by the Denver Broncos in the 1986 NFL Draft and was traded to the Saints.  He played alongside Jerry Rice and the two share records in the NCAA record book.  He is tenth all time in the record books for receiving touchdowns in 1985 and is thirteenth all time for career touchdowns.

1963 births
Living people
Sportspeople from Lafayette, Louisiana
Players of American football from Louisiana
American football wide receivers
Mississippi Valley State Delta Devils football players
New Orleans Saints players
National Football League replacement players